Department of Homeland Security v. Thuraissigiam, 591 U.S. ___ (2020), was a United States Supreme Court case involving whether the Illegal Immigration Reform and Immigrant Responsibility Act of 1996, which limits habeas corpus judicial review of the decisions of immigration officers, violates the Suspension Clause of Article One of the U.S. Constitution. In the 7–2 opinion, the Court ruled that the law does not violate the Suspension Clause.

The Department of Homeland Security placed Vijayakumar Thuraissigiam into "expedited removal" proceedings after Thuraissigiam was apprehended  from the southern U.S. border after crossing it illegally. Thuraissigiam, a Tamil former resident of Sri Lanka, pled for asylum asserting that he fled his country to "escape torture, beatings, and likely death". An immigration officer did not find his fear of persecution credible, and an immigration judge agreed with the officer's findings.

Thuraissigiam, represented by the American Civil Liberties Union, then filed a petition for a writ of habeas corpus, which a U.S. district court dismissed for lack of jurisdiction because of a section in the Illegal Immigration Reform and Immigrant Responsibility Act of 1996 that limits the judicial review of decisions made by immigration officers. On appeal, the U.S. Court of Appeals for the Ninth Circuit reversed, holding the section of the Act was unconstitutional because it violated the Suspension Clause.

On June 25, 2020, the Supreme Court reversed the Ninth Circuit. In a majority opinion authored by Justice Samuel Alito, the Court found that Thuraissigiam's claim for habeas corpus, to seek additional administrative review of his asylum claim, was beyond the scope established for habeas corpus in the Constitution, to secure release from unlawful detention. The majority opinion further rejected the argument that the Due Process Clause of the Fifth Amendment also compels judicial review of Thuraissigiam's claim.

Background

Federal immigration statute 

The Suspension Clause of Article One of the United States Constitution states that the writ of habeas corpus shall not be suspended except when a suspension may be required in cases of invasion or rebellion. In 1996, Congress passed the  Illegal Immigration Reform and Immigrant Responsibility Act, which designated certain undocumented immigrants as subject to "expedited removal". According to Linda Greenhouse, writing in The New York Times, expedited removal is intended for immigrants (or "aliens" in American terms) "who are deemed inadmissable upon arrival". Immigrants are entitled to claim they are entitled to refugee status, if they say they have a “credible fear of persecution or torture”, if returned home.

A single immigration officer will then make a determination as to whether the fear is credible.  If he or she determines it is credible, a panel will hold a hearing to explore the immigrant's refugee claim, in detail.  However, under the Illegal Immigration Reform and Immigrant Responsibility Act, if the single frontline officer's initial assessment is that the fear is not credible, there is no route of appeal. Specifically, the part of the act codified as  limits habeas corpus proceedings to the following determinations:
 whether the petitioner is an alien,
 whether the petitioner was ordered removed under such section, and
 whether the petitioner can prove by a preponderance of the evidence that the petitioner is an alien lawfully admitted for permanent residence, has been admitted as a refugee, or has been granted asylum.

Facts of the case 

The respondent, Vijayakumar Thuraissigiam, is an "inadmissible alien who was apprehended almost immediately after illegally crossing the U.S. border and was placed into expedited removal proceedings". According to the American Civil Liberties Union, which represented Thuraissigiam in the Supreme Court, Thuraissigiam is a Tamil former resident of Sri Lanka, who fled from Sri Lanka in order to "escape torture, beatings, and likely death". An asylum officer interviewed Thuraissigiam and concluded that he lacked a "credible fear of persecution on a protected ground or a credible fear of torture".

Lower court proceedings 

After reviewing Thuraissigiam's case, an immigration judge agreed with the immigration officer's conclusions, and ordinarily, this would have been a final decision not subject to appeal. Nevertheless, Thuraissigiam filed a petition for a writ of habeas corpus in the U.S. District Court for the Southern District of California, which dismissed the petition for lack of jurisdiction under the Illegal Immigration Reform and Immigrant Responsibility Act, specifically §1252(e)(2). Thuraissigiam then appealed to the U.S. Court of Appeals for the Ninth Circuit, which reversed, holding that §1252(e)(2) was unconstitutional because it violated the Suspension Clause.

Supreme Court 

The Department of Homeland Security filed a petition for a writ of certiorari in the Supreme Court of the United States, which granted certiorari on October 18, 2019, in order to review "whether, as applied to respondent, Section 1252(e)(2) is unconstitutional under the Suspension Clause". Oral arguments were heard on March 2, 2020.

Opinion of the Court 
The Court issued its decision on June 25, 2020. In a 7–2 opinion on judgment, the majority ruled that as under §1252(e)(2), the limits of review that a federal court may conduct on a petition for a writ of habeas corpus do not violate the Suspension Clause, reversing the Ninth Circuit's decision and remanding the case back for further review. The majority opinion was written by Justice Samuel Alito and joined by Chief Justice John Roberts and Justices Clarence Thomas, Neil Gorsuch and Brett Kavanaugh. Alito wrote that the habeas corpus claim made by Thuraissigiam failed as "it would extend the writ of habeas corpus far beyond its scope 'when the Constitution was drafted and ratified.'" as "Habeas has traditionally been a means to secure release from unlawful detention, but respondent invokes the writ to achieve an entirely different end, namely, to obtain additional administrative review of his asylum claim and ultimately to obtain authorization to stay in this country." Alito further addressed the claims of due process would only be extended to those "who have established connections in this country" and not to a situation like Thuraissigiam who had just entered the country.

Concurrence and dissent 
Justice Clarence Thomas wrote a concurring opinion "to address the original meaning of the Suspension Clause."

Justice Stephen Breyer wrote an opinion concurring only in the judgment, which was joined by Justice Ruth Bader Ginsburg. Breyer agreed with the majority opinion that the Suspension Clause was not violated in this specific case but would have ruled no further than that.

Justice Sonia Sotomayor wrote a dissent joined by Justice Elena Kagan. Sotomayor wrote that the majority opinion "handcuffs the Judiciary's ability to perform its constitutional duty to safeguard individual liberty and dismantles a critical component of the separation of powers" and that "It will leave significant exercises of executive discretion unchecked in the very circumstance where the writ's protections 'have been strongest'".

References

Further reading

External links
 
 Department of Homeland Security v. Thuraissigiam on the Supreme Court docket
 Text of 8 U.S.C. § 1252. Judicial review of orders of removal on Legal Information Institute

2020 in United States case law
United States Supreme Court cases
United States Supreme Court cases of the Roberts Court
United States immigration and naturalization case law
Sri Lanka–United States relations
Right of asylum case law
Right of asylum in the United States
Sri Lankan Tamil diaspora